Nemipterus tambuloides, commonly known as the fivelined threadfin bream, is a marine fish native to the western Pacific Ocean and Andaman Sea.

References

Fish of Thailand
Fish of Malaysia
Fish described in 1853
Fish of the Pacific Ocean
tambuloides